The Karate World Championships, also known as the World Karate Championships, are the highest level of competition for karate organized by the World Karate Federation (WKF).  The competition is held in a different city every two years. Championships in the 2000s included Madrid in 2002, Monterrey in 2004, Tampere in 2006, Tokyo in 2008, and Belgrade in 2010. The competition was initially riddled with controversy regarding karate styles and the ruleset.

In 1980, women were first allowed to compete in the championships.

Competition and events

Kumite
 Individual kumite – men and women
 Team kumite – men and women

Kumite Rules
The result of a bout is determined by a contestant obtaining a clear lead of eight points, having the highest number of points at time-up, obtaining a decision (hantei ), or by an accumulation of prohibited behaviors imposed against a contestant.

Scoring & Penalties 

Ippon (three points)
Jodan (head, face, neck) kicks
Any scoring technique delivered on a thrown or fallen opponent
Waza-ari (two points)
Chudan (abdomen, chest, back, side) kicks
Yuko (one point)
Tsuki (punch)
Uchi (strike)
Prohibited behavior
Category 1
Techniques which make excessive contact, in regards to the scoring area attacked, or make contact with the throat
Attacks to the arms or legs, groin, joints, or instep
Attacks to the face with open hand techniques
Dangerous or forbidden throwing techniques
Category 2
Feigning or exaggerating injury
Exit from the competition area (jogai ) not caused by the opponent
Self-endangerment by indulging in behavior which exposes the contestant to injury by the opponent, or failing to take adequate measures for self-protection (mubobi )
Avoiding combat as a means of preventing the opponent having the opportunity to score
Passivity – not attempting to engage in combat (cannot be given after less than the last 10 seconds of the match)
Clinching, wrestling, pushing, or standing chest-to-chest without attempting a scoring technique or takedown
Grabbing the opponent with both hands for any other reason than executing a takedown upon catching the opponent's kicking leg
Grabbing the opponent's arm or karategi (uniform) with one hand without immediately attempting a scoring technique or takedown
Techniques which, by their nature, cannot be controlled for the safety of the opponent, and other dangerous and uncontrolled attacks
Simulated attacks with the head, knees, or elbows
Talking to or goading the opponent
Failing to obey the orders of the referee
Warnings and penalties
Chukoku is imposed for the first instance of a minor infraction in the applicable category.
Keikoku is imposed for the second instance of a minor infraction in that category, or for infractions not serious enough to merit hansoku-chui.
Hansoku-chui is a warning of disqualification usually imposed for infractions for which a keikoku has previously been given in that bout; it may be imposed directly for serious infringements which do not merit hansoku.
Hansoku is the penalty of disqualification following a very serious infraction or when a hansoku-chui has already been given. In team matches, the offender's score will be zeroed and the opponent's score will be set at eight points.
Shikkaku is a penalty of disqualification in which the offender is expelled from the entire tournament. Generally, it is given for particularly severe infringements, beyond that which would normally result in hansoku being given. In a team match, the offender’s score is set to zero, and the non-offender’s score is set to eight points, as with a normal hansoku.

Kata
 Individual kata – men and women
 Team kata (synchronized) – men and women
 Team kata with bunkai

Rules 

1. Conformity - with standards in form and style (Ryu-ha)

2. Technical performance:
 Techniques
 Stances
 Transitional movements 
 Timing/Synchronisation 
 Correct breathing 
 Focus (Kime)
 Technical difficulty
3. Athletic performance:
 Strength
 Speed 
 Balance 
 Rhythm
4. Fouls:
 Minor loss of balance
 Performing a movement in an incorrect or incomplete manner
 Asynchronous movement 
 Use of audible cues
 Belt coming loose
 Time wasting
 Cause injury in the execution of Bunkai

List of Karate World Championships

All-time medal table
The following reflects the all-time medal counts as of the 2021 World Karate Championships:

See also

Asian Karate Championships

References

External links
 Official WKF site
 World Karate Federation Results
 Medal Table

 
Karate
World Championships
Recurring sporting events established in 1970